Creatures is a platform game for the Commodore 64 computer developed by Apex Computer Productions and released in 1990. The game was made by the two brothers, founders of the company, John Rowlands (programming) and Steve Rowlands (music and visual design). It was also later ported by WJS Design for Atari ST and released in 1992 and to the Amiga in 1993. 

The backronym "Clyde Radcliffe Exterminates All The Unfriendly Repulsive Earth-ridden Slime" is used as a subtitle for the game.

The game was followed by Creatures II: Torture Trouble in 1992.

Plot

The game takes place on a fictional planet called Blot. This planet used to be an inhabitable place for a race of creatures called Blotians, but for some reason they were in a great danger, so they built a spaceship and looked for another suitable planet. The creatures were renamed to the Fuzzy Wuzzies. The spaceship they built had to be landed because of a collision with an asteroid and the only planet near them was Earth. Fuzzy Wuzzies landed on in the Pacific near an unknown island where they built a city and named the island “The Happiest Place in The Known Universe”.

There is also another type of creature in the game: demons. They live on the other side of the island that Fuzzy Wuzzies are living on. The characteristics of those two in-game creatures, made them the natural enemy of each other. Demons invited the Fuzzy Wuzzies to a big party and captured them and locked them all up in a torture chamber.

The protagonist of the game is Clyde Radcliffe, a Fuzzy Wuzzy, who left the party before the demons capture Fuzzy Wuzzies. The game is about the journey of Clyde Radcliffe saving his species from torture chambers of demons.

Reception
The development of the game was chronicled in Zzap!64 magazine.
ZZap64 gave Creatures a score of 96%, Gold Medal (issue 12/90).

See also
 Mayhem in Monsterland

Further reading
"The Making of Creatures", Retro Gamer (March 31, 2014)
"Creatures", ST Format issue #47 (June 1993)
 "Creatures review", Eurogamer (Oct 26, 2007)
 "Creatures review", Computer and Video Games (March 1991)
 "Creatures review", Commodore Format issue #6 (March 1991)
 "Creatures review", Your Commodore issue #74 (Dec 1990)
 "Creatures review", Zzap!64 issue #68

External links

Creatures at Lemon64
Creatures on the Amiga at The Hall of Light (HOL)
Creatures on the Atari ST at The Little Green Desktop
GameStone UK

1990 video games
Platform games
Amiga games
Atari ST games
Commodore 64 games
Cancelled ZX Spectrum games
Video games about extraterrestrial life
Video games developed in the United Kingdom
Video games set on fictional islands
Thalamus Ltd games